The Sheppard Bone-Dry Act, sponsored by Sen. Morris Sheppard (D) of Texas, was passed by the US Congress in 1917. It imposed a ban on alcoholic beverages in the District of Columbia.

1917 in law
1917 in the United States
64th United States Congress
History of the District of Columbia
Prohibition in the United States